PAF Captain Carlos Martínez de Pinillos International Airport , known as Aeropuerto Internacional Capitán FAP Carlos Martínez de Pinillos in Spanish, is an airport serving Peru's third largest city, Trujillo, as well as the beach community of Huanchaco. It is the main air hub in northern Peru.

Airlines and destinations

See also
Transport in Peru
List of airports in Peru

References

External links 
OurAirports - Trujillo
SkyVector Aeronautical Charts

Airports in Peru
Buildings and structures in La Libertad Region